Pasoni Tasini (born May 31, 1993) is a former American football defensive end. He played college football at Utah.

College career
By the end of Tasini's college football career, he recorded 35 tackles, 1.5 sacks, six pass breakups and two forced fumbles.

Professional career

Arizona Cardinals
Tasini signed the Arizona Cardinals as an undrafted free agent on May 2, 2017. He was waived on September 2, 2017 and was signed to the practice squad the next day. He signed a reserve/future contract with the Cardinals on January 2, 2018.

On September 1, 2018, Tasini was waived by the Cardinals and was signed to the practice squad the next day. He was released on October 31, 2018. He was re-signed on December 5, 2018. He was promoted to the active roster on December 28, 2018.

On May 9, 2019, Tasini was waived by the Cardinals. He was re-signed on August 11, 2019. He was waived on August 31, 2019.

Seattle Dragons
In October 2019, Tasini was selected by the Seattle Dragons as part of the 2020 XFL Draft. He had his contract terminated when the league suspended operations on April 10, 2020.

References

1993 births
Living people
American football defensive linemen
Arizona Cardinals players
People from Ephraim, Utah
Players of American football from Utah
Seattle Dragons players
Utah Utes football players